Paul Shapiro is an American writer who authored the 2018 book Clean Meat: How Growing Meat Without Animals Will Revolutionize Dinner and the World. He's also the CEO and cofounder of The Better Meat Co. and the host of the Business for Good Podcast. He has delivered four TEDx talks relating to sustainable food and animal welfare. Prior to publishing Clean Meat, he was known for being an animal protection advocate, both as the founder of Animal Outlook (formerly Compassion Over Killing) and a Vice President at the Humane Society of the United States (HSUS).

Personal life
Shapiro is married to Toni Okamoto, author of The Super Easy Vegan Slow Cooker Cookbook, Plant-Based on a Budget and The Friendly Vegan. The two reside in Sacramento, Calif. with their adopted pit bull Eddie.

TEDx Talks
Shapiro is a TEDx speaker, giving talks on a number of topics, including:
TEDx SouthLakeTahoe in 2017: Clean Meat: The Clean Energy of Food 
TEDx Mid-Atlantic in 2018: What Will Future Generations Think of Our Treatment of Animals?
TEDx SunValley in 2017: We Are Better than How We Treat Animals 
TEDx University of Baltimore in 2018: Are We Doing More to Protect Aliens than Life on Earth?

Clean Meat
Shapiro's book Clean Meat: How Growing Meat Without Animals Will Revolutionize Dinner and the World, is the first book to explore the work of start-ups that are growing real animal products without animals. It was named as Washington Post bestseller in the week of January 7, 2018.

Reviews
Wall Street Journal: ‘Clean Meat’ Could Make Livestock Obsolete
NPR: Clean Meat, Via Lab, Is On The Way”
Fast Company: Our ‘Clean Meat’ Future Will Be Radical—But Also Inevitable
Sydney Morning Herald: Brave new burger – the race to put lab grown meat on the table
Psychology Today: Clean Meat Will Revolutionize Our Meals and the Entire World
Big Think: Lab-Grown "Clean Meat" is Almost Here. Will You Eat It?
Pacific Standard: Meat, Without All of the Blood and Guts
Kirkus: Clean Meat review

Excerpts and commentaries
Scientific American: Lab-Grown Meat is on the Way
Reuters: Science fiction no more, can lab-grown meat feed — and save — the world?
Quartz: Meet the startup that makes milk—without cows
The Guardian: Lab-made meat could be the next food revolution
Motherboard: Chicken Might Be the First Lab-Grown Meat to Make It to Your Grocery Store
Globe and Mail: Why holiday meals might look radically different in the near future”

Lab-grown leather-bound book
A copy of Clean Meat is the first book to be bound in lab-grown leather. The book, bound in “clean” leather grown by biotech start-up Geltor, was auctioned off on eBay on January 22, 2018 for $12,790.
The leather-bound book was featured in many news stories, including:
San Francisco Chronicle: “San Leandro lab’s secret foray yields animal-free leather”
Newsweek: “World’s First Animal-Free Leather Bound Book on Ebay for $10,000”
Smithsonian Magazine: “This Book Is Bound in Lab-Grown Jellyfish Leather”
Good Food Institute: “World’s First-Ever Clean Leather-Bound Book!”

The Better Meat Co. 
Shapiro co-founded The Better Meat Co. in early 2018 and serves as its CEO. The company's goal is to help meat producers improve sustainability by blending in the start-up's plant-based proteins in their ground meat products.
In 2019. Perdue partnered with The Better Meat Co. and started using The Better Meat Co.’s plant-based formula in its blended line of chicken tenders, nuggets, and patties called Perdue Chicken Plus.

In 2021, Hormel Foods Corporation announced a partnership with The Better Meat Co. in which the food company will develop alternative meat products using the start-up's fermented mycoproteins.

Business for Good Podcast 
Shapiro co-founded the Business for Good Podcast with his partner Toni Okamoto in 2018. The two co-hosted the first season. Shapiro is the sole host of the podcast’s second, third, and fourth seasons. The show features companies and investors with a social mission to help solve problems such as pollution, food waste, unhealthy eating, animal cruelty, and more.

Work with Compassion Over Killing
When he was thirteen years old, Shapiro stopped eating meat as a result of learning about the methods of meat production. About one month later, he stopped eating eggs and dairy.
	
While a high school student at Georgetown Day School in 1995, Shapiro founded the animal advocacy organization Compassion Over Killing, and served as an undercover investigator and its campaigns director until 2005. Compassion Over Killing became well known for its investigative work exposing conditions for farm animals on factory farms, at livestock auctions, and at slaughter plants.

Shapiro helped spearhead the campaign to end the use of the "Animal Care Certified" logo on egg cartons in the United States. In that case, the egg industry was labeling eggs from hens confined in battery cages as "Animal Care Certified." After Better Business Bureau rulings, federal petitions, investigations at "Animal Care Certified" egg facilities leading to media exposés, and other efforts, in September 2005, the Federal Trade Commission announced that the logo would be removed from egg cartons nationwide.

Shapiro received a B.A. from George Washington University in 2001, where he majored in peace studies and minored in religion. He taught peace studies at a public high school in Washington, D.C. He was profiled in a 2003 Washington Post Style section article entitled "Animal Pragmatism: Compassion Over Killing Wants to Make the Anti-Meat Message a Little More Palatable".

In 2020, Compassion Over Killing changed its name to Animal Outlook.

Work with the Humane Society of the United States
From 2005 through 2016, Shapiro led many of HSUS's efforts to protect farm animals, including serving as Vice President of the organization's Farm Animal Protection campaign, including efforts to convince retailers, food service providers, and universities to end their use of eggs from battery-caged birds, pork from gestation-stalled pigs, and to expand their vegan options. Additionally, the Farm Animal Protection campaign played a significant role in helping enact Proposition 2 in California, a 2008 ballot initiative that phases out veal crates, battery cages, and gestation crates in the nation's largest agricultural state. The campaign was also central in Proposition 204, a successful 2006 Arizona ballot initiative that phases out gestation crates and veal crates, as well as Question 3, a 2016 similar Massachusetts ballot initiative. It has also helped pass laws to phase out gestation crates and other agricultural confinement practices in numerous other states.

In 2008, Shapiro was inducted into the Animal Rights Hall of Fame.

In 2016, female employees at HSUS filed a complaint with HSUS human resources representatives over a pattern of inappropriate sexual behavior they had witnessed over the preceding six years. A month later Shapiro moved to a different department to "advance HSUS' broader agenda." He subsequently served as HSUS's Vice President of Policy for 16 months before departing to release Clean Meat in January 2018 and commence a book tour.

While at HSUS, Shapiro also authored "Moral agency in other animals", published in the 2006 edition of Theoretical Medicine and Bioethics. He was also a contributor to Animal Welfare in Animal Agriculture.

Articles

See also

Cultured meat
Food technology
Plant-based diet
Animal protectionism
 List of animal rights advocates

References

External links

Clean Meat official website

1979 births
Living people
American animal rights activists
American veganism activists
George Washington University alumni